Iddaru Mitrulu is a 1961 Indian Telugu-language drama film directed by Adurthi Subba Rao and produced by D. Madhusudhana Rao under Annapurna Pictures. The film stars Akkineni Nageswara Rao, Rajasulochana and E. V. Saroja, with music composed by S. Rajeswara Rao. It is a remake of the 1957 Bengali film Tasher Ghar. The film was also made in Tamil as Ennai Pol Oruvan.  Urvashi Sharada made her Telugu cinema debut in her first significant adult role through this film.

Plot 
Two strangers, Ajay and Vijay, lookalikes meet by chance and start sharing their miseries. Ajay is a multi-millionaire, studying abroad and returns knowing of his father's death. During that plight, his malevolent and sly manager Bhanoji Rao, who poses as a loyalist, throws him into huge debts to usurp his wealth. On the other hand, Vijay is a graduate belonging to a poor family, suffering from unemployment. His sister Meena is discarded by her in-laws for dowry and his innocent devotional father Ramadasu does not support them. Right now, both of them decide to exchange places for a year with a mutual agreement. Ajay is very happy with affection and family bondage at Vijay's place. But Vijay is caught by Ajay's blind paternal aunt through her senses and rages on Vijay. However, after knowing the reality from Ajay she too aids them. From there on, Vijay foils Bhanoji Rao's plots when he also finds out he has the jewellery of Ajay's mother and also created a duplicate legitimate that Ajay has to compulsorily marry his only daughter Sarala. To get rid of these puzzling situations and expose the falsity of Bhanoji Rao, Vijay moves close with Sarala, but after understanding her virtue he truly falls for her. Meanwhile, Ajay joins as a mechanic for livelihood and falls in love with colleague Prakash's (Nanduri Muralikrishna) sister Padma.

Moreover, Ajay could not witnesses the agony of Meena, so, he threatens his coward brother-in-law Bujji to turn back his wife. Terror-stricken Bujji secretly visits his in-law's without knowledge of his avaricious father Parandhamaiah. After some time, Meena becomes pregnant when neighbours heckle and suspect her chastity. So, Ajay immediately meets Parandhamaiah, but he refuses to accept Meena until Vijay pays the dowry amount. To make it decisive, Ajay approaches Vijay, unfortunately by the time, Vijay leaves to a picnic with Sarala and breaks out the mystery behind the stolen treasure. Here, helpless Ajay forges his own signature, draws the required amount, sends Meena to her in-law's house but he was caught and taken into custody. Meanwhile, Bhanoji Rao learns about the agreement between Ajay and Vijay so, he ploys to hasten the marriage of Sarala with Vijay to gain authority over Ajay's property. Subsequently, Vijay astutely gives a check to Bhanoji Rao and confesses to him. At last, Vijay is about to leave the house when Ajay stops him and shares half of his property with him. Finally, the movie ends on a happy note with the marriages of Ajay with Padma and Vijay with Sarala.

Cast 
 Akkineni Nageswara Rao as Ajay Babu and Vijay Kumar (Dual role)
 Raja Sulochana as Sarala
 E. V. Saroja as Padma
 Relangi as Parandhamaiah
 Ramana Reddy as Ramadasu
 Gummadi as Bhanoji Rao
 Padmanabham as Bujji
 Allu Ramalingaiah as Seshavataram
 Suryakantham as Suramma
 G. Varalakshmi as Ajay's aunt
 Sharada as Meena
 Potti Prasad as Kurmavataram
 Boddapati as Varahavataram
 A. V. Subbarao Jr. as Police Commissioner
 Jyothi as Dancer

Soundtrack 
Music composed by S. Rajeswara Rao.

References

External links 

1961 films
1960s Telugu-language films
Indian drama films
Telugu remakes of Bengali films
Indian black-and-white films
Films scored by S. Rajeswara Rao
Films directed by Adurthi Subba Rao